Kooduthedunna Parava is a 1984 Indian Malayalam film, directed by P. K. Joseph and produced by Thiruppathi Chettiyar. The film stars Ratheesh, Captain Raju, Balan K. Nair and Jalaja in the lead roles. The film has musical score by A. T. Ummer.

Cast
Ratheesh as Gopi
Captain Raju as Sub-inspector 
Balan K. Nair as Khader kakka 
Jalaja as Salma 
Jose as Salim
T. G. Ravi as Surendran
Kunchan as Gopan 
Meena as Sarasamma
Prathapachandran as Setji
Syamala Gouri as Savithri
Vallathol Unnikrishnan as constable Kuttan Pilla
Master Suresh as Ramu
Rajendran as Subinspector

Soundtrack
The music was composed by A. T. Ummer and the lyrics were written by Poovachal Khader.

References

External links
 

1984 films
1980s Malayalam-language films